Leo Sheptycki (born as Leon Ludwik Szeptycki; ; 23 August 1717 – 13 May 1779) was the "Metropolitan of Kiev, Galicia and all Ruthenia"

On 14 May 1749 Sheptycki was ordained by bishop of Luck Theodosius Rudnicki-Lubieniecki with help of Theodosius Godebski and Adam Oranski as a bishop of Lwow.

On 20 December 1762 he was confirmed as the Coadjutor Metropolitan bishop of Kiev, Galicia, and all Ruthenia. On 1 February 1778 he succeeded Metropolitan Philip.

He consecrated following bishops Gedeon Horbacki, and Athanasius Szeptycki. He died on 24 May 1779

Notelist

References 
 Leo Szeptycki at the catholic-hierarchy.org

1717 births
1779 deaths
Eastern Catholics from the Russian Empire
People from Lviv Oblast
People from Ruthenian Voivodeship
Ruthenian nobility of the Polish–Lithuanian Commonwealth
Metropolitans of Kiev, Galicia and all Ruthenia (Holy See)
Leo 
Recipients of the Order of the White Eagle (Poland)